Tomislav Čižmešija (born 31 August 1968) is a Croatian retired figure skater who competed internationally for both Croatia and SFR Yugoslavia. He was Croatia's flag bearer in the opening ceremony of the 1992 Winter Olympics in Albertville, the nation's first Olympic appearance since gaining independence in 1991. Čižmešija placed 29th in men's singles. He is an ISU judge and international referee.

He is the brother of Željka Čižmešija, who competed in ladies' singles for Croatia at the 1992 Olympics.

Results

References

Yugoslav male single skaters
Croatian male single skaters
Figure skaters at the 1992 Winter Olympics
Olympic figure skaters of Croatia
Living people
1968 births
Sportspeople from Zagreb